The 1982 NCAA Women's Golf Championships were the inaugural NCAA-sanctioned golf tournament to determine the individual and team national champions of women's collegiate golf in the United States. Through 1996, the NCAA would hold only one women's golf championship for programs across Division I, Division II, and Division III.

The tournament was held at the Stanford Golf Course in Stanford, California.

Tulsa won the team championship.

Kathy Baker, from Tulsa, won the individual title.

A 13th and final AIAW Women's Golf Championship was also held this year and also won by Tulsa.

Individual results

Individual champion
 Kathy Baker, Tulsa

Team results

References

NCAA Women's Golf Championship
Golf in California
NCAA Women's Golf Championship
NCAA Women's Golf Championship
NCAA Women's Golf Championship